Turnhout is a railway station in Turnhout, Antwerp, Belgium. The station opened in 1855 and is located on Line 29.

Train services

The station is served by the following services:

Intercity services (IC-11) Binche - Braine-le-Comte - Halle - Brussels - Mechelen - Turnhout (weekdays)
Intercity services (IC-30) Antwerp - Herentals - Turnhout

Bus services
The following bus services stop near the station. They are operated by De Lijn.

1 (Zevendonk – Markt – Vosselaar – Beerse)
2 (Boomgaardplein – Markt – Station – Parkwijk)
200 (Turnhout – Vosselaar – Tielen – Kasterlee)
210 (Turnhout – Lille – Herentals)
212 (Turnhout – Gierle – Lichtaart – Herentals)
213 (Turnhout – Lille – Vorselaar – Grobbendonk)
305 (Turnhout – Herentals – Herselt – Aarschot – Leuven)
410 (Turnhout – Malle – Antwerpen)
415 (Turnhout – Beerse – Antwerpen) Express
416 (Turnhout – Wechelderzaande – Antwerpen) Express
417 (Turnhout – Zoersel – Antwerpen) Express
419 (Turnhout – Malle – Sint-Antonius – Zandhoven)
430 (Meersel-dreef – Hoogstraaten – Turnhout – Mol)
431 (Oud-Turnhout – Turnhout – Beerse – Rijkevorsel – Oostmalle)
432 (Oud-Turnhout – Turnhout – Merksplas – Rijkevorsel – Brecht)
433 (Turnhout – Beerse – Rijkevorsel – Hoogstraten)
434 (Turnhout – Beerse – Merksplas – Hoogstraten)
435 (Turnhout industrie – Beerse – Rijkevorsel – Hoogstraten)
436 (Turnhout – Retie – Donk – Achterbos – Mol)
437 (Turnhout – Retie – Achterbos – Mol via Boeretang)
450 (Turnhout – Poppel – Tilburg)
451 (Turnhout – Weelde Stenenbrug – Poppel)
460 (Turnhout – Baarle-Hertog)
480 (Turnhout AZ Sint-Jozef – Arendonk – Reusel)
490 (Turnhout – Geel – Westerlo – Herselt – Aarschot)
492 (Turnhout – Geel – Westerlo – Blauberg – Herselt – Aarschot)
942 (Belbus Turnhout – Oud-Turnhout – Vosselaar – Beerse)

References

External links
 Turnhout railway station at Belgian Railways website

Railway stations opened in 1855
Railway stations in Belgium
Railway stations in Antwerp Province
Turnhout
1855 establishments in Belgium